Alexander Benjamin "Aleck" Smith (1871 – July 9, 1919) was an American Major League Baseball catcher from New York City. Nicknamed Broadway Aleck, he played nine seasons in the majors, between 1897 and 1906, for six different teams.

He had a nine-year career in the major leagues, and played a total of 287 games with a .264 average, 1 HR, and 130 RBI. Although he spent most of his career behind the plate, Smith also played 57 games in the outfield, 18 at first base, 10 at third base and 5 at second.

He is interred at Woodlawn Cemetery in the Bronx, New York City.

References

External links

1871 births
1919 deaths
Major League Baseball catchers
19th-century baseball players
Brooklyn Superbas players
Brooklyn Bridegrooms players
New York Giants (NL) players
Boston Americans players
Baltimore Orioles (NL) players
Chicago Cubs players
Baltimore Orioles (1901–02) players
Syracuse Stars (minor league baseball) players
Scranton Coal Heavers players
Milwaukee Brewers (minor league) players
Milwaukee Creams players
Providence Grays (minor league) players
Baseball players from New York City
Date of birth missing
Burials at Woodlawn Cemetery (Bronx, New York)